Kirkcudbright Stewartry, later known as Kirkcudbright or Kirkcudbrightshire, was a Scottish constituency of the House of Commons of the Parliament of Great Britain from 1708 to 1801 and of the Parliament of the United Kingdom from 1801 to 1918. It was represented by one Member of Parliament (MP).

Creation
The British parliamentary constituency was created in 1708 following the Acts of Union, 1707 and replaced the former Parliament of Scotland shire constituency of Kirkcudbright Stewartry. The first election in the stewartry was in 1708. In 1707–08, members of the 1702-1707 Parliament of Scotland were co-opted to serve in the 1st Parliament of Great Britain. See Scottish representatives to the 1st Parliament of Great Britain, for further details.

Boundaries 
The Stewartry of Kirkcudbright was a Scottish stewartry (later considered to be a county and sometimes called Kirkcudbrightshire), which had been represented by two commissioners in the former Parliament of Scotland. The constituency included the whole stewartry, except for the Royal burghs of Kirkcudbright (which formed part of the Dumfries Burghs constituency) and New Galloway (which between 1708 and 1885 was included in the Wigtown Burghs district). In 1918 the area was combined with Wigtownshire to form the Galloway constituency.

History
The constituency elected one Member of Parliament (MP) by the first past the post system until the seat was abolished in 1918.

Members of Parliament

Elections

Elections in the 1830s

Fergusson was appointed Judge-Advocate General of the Armed Forces, requiring a by-election.

Fergusson was appointed Judge-Advocate General of the Armed Forces, requiring a by-election.

Fergusson's death caused a by-election.

Elections in the 1840s

Murray's death caused a by-election.

Maitland was appointed Solicitor General for Scotland, requiring a by-election.

Elections in the 1850s
Maitland resigned after being appointed a senator of the College of Justice, becoming Lord Dundrennan and causing a by-election.

Elections in the 1860s

Mackie's death caused a by-election.

Elections in the 1870s

Elections in the 1880s

Elections in the 1890s

Elections in the 1900s

Elections in the 1910s

General Election 1914–15:

Another General Election was required to take place before the end of 1915. The political parties had been making preparations for an election to take place and by the July 1914, the following candidates had been selected; 
Liberal: Gilbert McMicking
Unionist:

References 

Politics of Dumfries and Galloway
Historic parliamentary constituencies in Scotland (Westminster)
Constituencies of the Parliament of the United Kingdom disestablished in 1918
Constituencies of the Parliament of the United Kingdom established in 1708